Burbank Airport–South station, referred to as Hollywood Burbank Airport station by Amtrak and formerly known as Bob Hope Airport station, is an unstaffed Amtrak and Metrolink train station at Hollywood Burbank Airport in the city of Burbank, California. Amtrak's Pacific Surfliner from San Luis Obispo to San Diego, Amtrak's Coast Starlight from Los Angeles to Seattle, Washington, and Metrolink's Ventura County Line from Los Angeles Union Station to East Ventura stop here. 

 Amtrak's Coast Starlight serves the station with one train daily in each direction.

The station is located across Empire Avenue from the airport's Regional Intermodal Transportation Center (RITC). Most city bus lines stop at the bottom level of the RITC. Passengers travelling to the airport can take an elevator or escalator to a pedestrian bridge that connects the RITC to the terminal with moving walkways. The airport also offers shuttle service for those unable or unwilling to use the pedestrian bridge and moving walkways.

Of the 76 California stations served by Amtrak, Burbank was the 28th-busiest in FY2017, with 73,814 total passengers.

History
The station was opened in February 1983 as an infill station on the short-lived CalTrain line. It would see less than one month of use by this service. Amtrak began limited service there on June 1, 1990. Metrolink trains began using the station on April 24, 1995, after the completion of a project to lengthen the platform.

The station is part of a new intermodal transportation center which the Burbank City Council approved in late August 2010. The facility cost around $93 million. Groundbreaking occurred during the summer of 2012 and construction was completed summer 2014. It serves rail, air and bus travelers, as well as incorporating rental car facilities.

References

External links

 Burbank Airport Amtrak & Metrolink Station (USA RailGuide-TrainWeb)

Burbank airport
Metrolink stations in Los Angeles County, California
Buildings and structures in Burbank, California
Public transportation in the San Fernando Valley
Airport railway stations in the United States
Railway stations in the United States opened in 1983
Railway stations in the United States opened in 1990
1983 establishments in California
1990 establishments in California
Railway stations closed in 1983